The 1992-93 LSU Tigers men's basketball team represented Louisiana State University during the 1992–93 NCAA men's college basketball season. The head coach was Dale Brown. The team was a member of the Southeastern Conference and played their home games at 
Pete Maravich Assembly Center.

The Tigers finished second in the SEC West standings, and made a strong run to the championship game of the SEC Tournament. LSU received an at-large bid to the NCAA tournament as No. 11 seed in the Midwest region where they lost in the opening round to California. After ten straight tournament appearances (and 13 overall), this would be the last season Coach Brown would take a team to the NCAA Tournament. The team finished with a 22–11 record (9–7 SEC).

Roster

Schedule and results

|-
!colspan=9 style=| Exhibition

|-
!colspan=9 style=| Non-conference regular season

|-
!colspan=9 style=| SEC regular season

|-
!colspan=12 style=| SEC Tournament

|-
!colspan=12 style=| NCAA Tournament

Team players drafted into the NBA

References

LSU Tigers basketball seasons
Lsu
Lsu
LSU
LSU